Han Bong-zin (a.k.a. Han Bong Jin; born 2 September 1945) is a North Korean football midfielder who played for North Korea in the 1966 FIFA World Cup. He also played for 2.8 Sports Team.

References

1945 births
Sportspeople from Pyongyang
North Korean footballers
North Korea international footballers
Association football midfielders
1966 FIFA World Cup players
Living people